Bosundhora (lit. Bashundhara is a 1977 Bengali-language Bangladeshi film directed by Subhash Dutta. The film was based on the Alauddin Al Azad novel Teish Nambor Toilochitra. The films produced by Bangladesh Liberation War Welfare Trust. The film began shooting on 6 March 1977. The film stars Bobita and Ilias Kanchan in the leading roles with Sharmili Ahmed, Syed Hasan Imam, Timur, Nuton, Akram, Soleman, Kabira, Sushoma, and Mondira in supporting roles. In 1977, the film won Bangladesh National Film Award for the best films within another 6 category.

Cast
 Bobita - Chobi
 Ilias Kanchan - Zahed
 Sharmili Ahmed
 Syed Hasan Imam
 Timur
 Nuton
 Akram
 Soleman
 Kabira
 Sushoma
 Mondira

Music
The film song directed by renowned music composer and music director Satya Saha. Song composed by Syed Shamsul Haque.

"Rongdhonu Chhoriye Chetonar Akashe" - Sabina Yasmin

Awards
National Film Awards

 Won: Best Films - Subhash Dutta (Producer)
 Won: Best Director - Subhash Dutta
 Won: Best Actress - Bobita
 Won: Best Supporting Actor - Syed Hasan Imam
 Won: Best screenplay - Alauddin Al Azad
 Won: Best Art Editor - Mohiuddin Farooq

International Film Festival
 International Film Festival - 1978

References

External links

 

1977 films
Best Film National Film Award (Bangladesh) winners
Bangladeshi drama films
1977 drama films
Bengali-language Bangladeshi films
Films scored by Satya Saha
1970s Bengali-language films
Best Film Bachsas Award winners